The Mirwais Hospital (Pashto:  د ميرويس نيکه حوزوي روغتون), also known as Shafakhanai Chinai, is a hospital in the city of Kandahar, in southern Afghanistan. It is named after Mirwais Hotak, who is known in the area as Mirwais Neeka (Mirwais the Grandfather). It is one of several advanced medical-treatment facilities in the area.

History
The 600-bed hospital was built with aid from China in 1979, but services have been affected by years of fighting in the region. The hospital was damaged during the long period of unrest in the country. It was rebuilt by the ICRC in 1995. It is a state-run facility and receives 70% of its funding from the International Committee of the Red Cross, who have about 30 expatriate staffs working permanently at the hospital. Despite this, the hospital is faced with lack or proper facilities and resources.

Services
The hospital has:
 150-bed surgical unit
 3 operating theatres
 blood bank
 X-ray department
 kitchen facilities to provide food for patients and staff
 laundry facility

According to a report by The Senlis Council, not only people from Kandahar province are treated at Mirwais Hospital but also from neighboring Helmand, Zabul, Oruzgan and others.

This hospital is the teaching hospital for Kandahar University's Faculty of Medicine.

See also
 Healthcare in Afghanistan

References

External links

Hospital buildings completed in 1979
Kandahar
Hospitals in Afghanistan
1979 establishments in Afghanistan
Hospitals established in 1979